Mingus at Carnegie Hall is a live album by the jazz bassist and composer Charles Mingus, recorded at  Carnegie Hall in January 1974 by Mingus with Jon Faddis, Charles McPherson, John Handy, George Adams, Rahsaan Roland Kirk, Hamiet Bluiett, Don Pullen, and Dannie Richmond. The original release did not include the first part of the concert, featuring Mingus’s working sextet without Handy, Kirk, and McPherson. An expanded “Deluxe Edition” including the entire concert, was issued in 2021.

Reception
The AllMusic review by Stuart Kremsky states: "This is a fun 45 minutes, particularly for the jovial interplay between saxophonists Kirk and Adams, but in its released form, only hints at the strength of The Jazz Workshop in 1974."

Track listing
 "C Jam Blues" (Barney Bigard, Duke Ellington) – 24:32  
 "Perdido" (Juan Tizol) – 21:53  
Recorded on January 19, 1974, at Carnegie Hall, New York City

Expanded reissue
Disc 1
 "Introduction" – 3:11
 "Peggy’s Blue Skylight" (Charles Mingus) – 11:54
 "Celia" (Charles Mingus) – 22:54
 "Fables of Faubus" (Charles Mingus) – 20:51
Disc 2
 "Big Alice" (Don Pullen) – 18:39
 "Perdido" (Juan Tizol) – 22:32
 "C Jam Blues" (Barney Bigard, Duke Ellington) – 24:41

Personnel
Charles Mingus – bass
Jon Faddis – trumpet
Charles McPherson – alto saxophone (on "C Jam Blues" and "Perdido" only)
John Handy –  tenor saxophone, alto saxophone (on "C Jam Blues" and "Perdido" only)
George Adams – tenor saxophone
Rahsaan Roland Kirk – tenor saxophone, stritch (on "C Jam Blues" and "Perdido" only)
Hamiet Bluiett – baritone saxophone
Don Pullen – piano
Dannie Richmond – drums

References

Charles Mingus live albums
1974 live albums
Atlantic Records live albums
Albums produced by Joel Dorn
Albums recorded at Carnegie Hall